The 1992 Cal State Fullerton Titans football team represented California State University, Fullerton as a member of the Big West Conference during the 1992 NCAA Division I-A football season. Led by 13th-year head coach Gene Murphy, Cal State Fullerton compiled an overall record of 2–9 with a mark of 0–6 in conference play, placing last out of sevens teams in the Big West. This was the third consecutive season that the team finished at the bottom of the Big West standings. Cal State Fullerton set an NCAA record for most fumbles in a season (71) and most fumbles lost in a season (41). The Titans played their home gamesat the new on-campus Titan Stadium in Fullerton, California.

Citing financial pressure, Cal State Fullerton dropped intercollegiate football after the 1992 season.

Schedule

References

Cal State Fullerton
Cal State Fullerton Titans football seasons
Cal State Fullerton Titans football